Achaiki Football Club is a Greek football club based in Kato Achaia, Achaea, Greece.

The club was founded as an independent club in 1920 and dissolved in 1936. It we re-founded in 1945. The highest category team reached was Football League in 1981-82 and 1982-83 seasons. They played for their second season in Football League 2 for the season 2014-15.

Honours

Domestic
 Delta Ethniki Champions: 3
 1986-87, 1997-98, 2003-04
 Achaea FCA Champions: 3
 1970-71, 1977-78, 2015-16
 Achaea FCA Cup Winners: 4
 1976-77, 1978-79, 1979-80, 1996-97

Football clubs in Western Greece

Gamma Ethniki clubs